André Desmarais  (born October 26, 1956) is a Canadian businessman and philanthropist.

Early life
He is the youngest son of Paul Desmarais Sr. and Jacqueline Desmarais. Born in Ottawa, Ontario, he attended Lakefield College School in Ontario for two years, then Selwyn House School. Desmarais is a graduate of Concordia University in Montreal (BComm 78, LLD 07).

Career
André Desmarais is currently deputy chairman of the company his father took control of in 1968, Power Corporation, based in Montreal, Quebec, Canada. He is also deputy chairman of Power Financial. Power Corporation is an international management and holding company that focuses on financial services in North America, Europe and Asia. Its core holdings are leading insurance, retirement, wealth management and investment businesses, including a portfolio of alternative asset investment platforms. Through its European-based affiliate, the Pargesa group, it also has significant holdings in a portfolio of global companies based in Europe.

Desmarais began his career at Campeau Corporation in 1979. From 1980 to 1981, he was special assistant to the Minister of Justice of Canada. Between 1981 and 1982, he was an institutional investment counsellor at Richardson Greenshields Ltd. In 1983, Desmarais returned to Power Corporation of Canada. In 1984, he was appointed president and chief operating officer of Gesca ltée and chairman and chief executive officer of Power Broadcasting Inc., in 1988. In 1991, he became president and chief operating officer of Power Corporation of Canada. In 1994, he was named chairman of Power Pacific Corporation Limited; director and member of the executive committee of Power Corporation of Canada and Power Financial Corporation. In 1996, Desmarais was appointed president and co-chief executive officer of Power Corporation of Canada and deputy chairman of Power Financial Corporation. In May 2008, he was also appointed deputy chairman of Power Corporation of Canada and became executive co-chairman of Power Financial Corporation.

In 2020, after 24 years as co-chief executive officer of Power Corporation, Desmarais retired from this role. He continues to play an active role in the governance of Power Corporation and maintains his position as deputy chairman of the board.

Board memberships
 Deputy Chairman: Power Corporation and Power Financial
 Great-West Lifeco Inc.
 Canada Life
 Empower Retirement
 Putnam Investments 
 IGM Financial Inc. 
 IG Wealth Management
 Mackenzie 
 Vice-chairman: Pargesa Holding SA

Professional memberships
 Honorary Chairman of the Canada China Business Council
 Member of The Trilateral Commission
 Member of the Chairman's International Advisory Council of the Americas Society
 Member of several China-based organizations

Past engagements

Member of the Hong Kong Chief Executive's Council of International Advisers from 1998 to 2007.

Appointed in 2003 to the international council of the JP Morgan Chase Bank until 2010.

Honours

- 2003: Named an officer of the Order of Canada

- 2009: Made an Officer of the National Order of Quebec

- Doctorate honoris causa from Concordia University, Université de Montréal and McGill University

- President of the honorary members – lieutenant-colonel of the Voltigeurs de Québec.

Personal life

He married France Chrétien Desmarais, the daughter of former Prime Minister of Canada Jean Chrétien, on May 23, 1981. They have four children.

In August 2016, The Wall Street Journal mentions that André Desmarais and his brother Paul Jr. "are readying their 34-year-old sons (Olivier Desmarais and Paul Desmarais III) to take over Power Corp".

Philanthropy

Desmarais has played key roles in a number of fundraising campaigns, including those of the Montreal Museum of Fine Arts, the Montreal Heart Institute, the Montreal General Hospital, Leucan, the Canadian Red Cross, the Canadian Cancer Society (The Daffodil Ball), Centraide of Greater Montreal and the Jean Paul Riopelle Foundation.

In November 2015, André Desmarais and his wife donated 3 million Canadian dollars to the Montreal Heart Institute.

Desmarais is also chairman of the Foundation Baxter & Alma Ricard.

References

Directors of Power Corporation of Canada
Officers of the Order of Canada
Officers of the National Order of Quebec
Franco-Ontarian people
Concordia University alumni
Businesspeople from Ottawa
1956 births
Living people
Andre